was a town located in Gujō District, Gifu Prefecture, Japan.

History 
The town was established as a town in 1889.

On March 1, 2004, Hachiman, along with the towns of Shirotori and Yamato, and the villages of Meihō, Minami, Takasu and Wara (all from Gujō District), was merged to create the city of Gujō.

Notes

External links 
 Official website of Gujō 

Dissolved municipalities of Gifu Prefecture
Gujō, Gifu